The Hydnodontaceae are a family of fungi in the class Agaricomycetes. According to a 2008 estimate, the family contains 15 genera and 105 species. It is the only family in the order Trechisporales.

References

 
Basidiomycota orders